Parker and Sampson Ditch is a  long first-order tributary to Marshyhope Creek in Sussex County, Delaware.  This is the only stream of this name in the United States.

Course
Parker and Sampson Ditch rises on the Polk and Bee Branch divides about 1-mile southwest of Greenwood, Delaware, and then flows northwest to join Marshyhope Creek about 0.5 miles north-northeast of Woodenhawk, Delaware.

Watershed
Parker and Sampson Ditch drains  of area, receives about 45.0 in/year of precipitation, and is about 17.62% forested.

See also
List of rivers of Delaware

References

Rivers of Delaware
Rivers of Sussex County, Delaware